Fast Break is a 1989 video game developed and published by Accolade. It was released for the Amiga, Apple IIgs, Commodore 64, Macintosh and DOS.

Description

Fast Break simulates the game of basketball, allowing one or two players to control the players with either the keyboard or a joystick.

References

1989 video games
Accolade (company) games
Amiga games
Apple IIGS games
Basketball video games
Commodore 64 games
DOS games
Classic Mac OS games
Multiplayer and single-player video games
Video games developed in the United States